The 2017 Lebanese Elite Cup is the 20th edition of this football tournament in Lebanon. The competition started on 4 August through to the final on 20 August. This tournament included the six best teams from the 2016–17 Lebanese Premier League season.

Group stage

Group A

Group B

Final stage

Semi finals

Final

References 

Lebanese Elite Cup seasons
Elite